Prasiola crispa is a small terrestrial green alga.

Taxonomy 
The species, first described as Ulva crispa Lightfoot, is the type of the genus Prasiola.
A lectotype was nominated for the species, the type location of which was provided in accompanying notation as walls that faced north and were favoured as urinals.

The specific epithet is said to translate as "crisped", a reference to the irregular convolutions of the species.

Description
This is a small green alga growing to about 6 cm long. The frond is round in shape, flattened. Generally one cell thick, the cells are arranged in rows or in groups of four.
  

It seems to be an important food source for Antarctic collembolans.

The species has been used a model for the study of the effects of high intensities of UV radiation on photosynthesis.

Reproduction
Reproduction is by akinetes  and aplanospores.

Distribution
Recorded world-wide mostly from cold-temperate to polar regions, e.g. from Iceland, the British Isles including the Isle of Man, New Zealand, Japan and the Pacific shores of North America. In Antarctica, the species lives near penguin colonies.

Conservation status
In Iceland, it is red listed as a vulnerable species (VU).

References

Prasiolales
Seaweeds